Albert Lautman (8 February 1908 – 1 August 1944) was a French philosopher of mathematics, born in Paris. An escaped prisoner of war, he was shot by the Nazi authorities in Toulouse on 1 August 1944.

Family
His father was a Jewish emigrant from Vienna who became a medical doctor after he was seriously wounded in the First World War.

Selected bibliography
Essai sur les Notions de Structure et d'Existence en Mathématiques
Essai sur l'Unité des Sciences Mathématiques
Symétrie et Dissymétrie en Mathématiques et en Physique
Les Mathématiques, les idées et le réel physique

Translations
Mathematics, Ideas and the Physical Real (2011) - this volume advertises itself as "the first English collection of the work of Albert Lautman"

Notes

External links
Fractal Ontology (English) with translations of Lautman's work by Taylor Adkins and Joseph Weissman.

1908 births
1944 deaths
Writers from Paris
Jews in the French resistance
École Normale Supérieure alumni
Philosophers of mathematics
20th-century French philosophers
World War II prisoners of war held by Germany
French prisoners of war in World War II
Deaths by firearm in France
People executed by Germany by firearm
Resistance members killed by Nazi Germany
French people executed by Nazi Germany
French male non-fiction writers
20th-century French male writers